Doss is an unincorporated community in Cass County, Texas, about 12 miles from Hughes Springs.  It is located on Farm To Market Road 1399.

References

Unincorporated communities in Cass County, Texas
Unincorporated communities in Texas